Potassium octachlorodimolybdate (systematically named potassium bis(tetrachloromolybdate)(Mo–Mo)(4−)) is an inorganic compound with the chemical formula . It is known as a red-coloured, microcrystalline solid. The anion is of historic interest as one of the earliest illustrations of a quadruple bonding. The salt is usually obtained as the pink-coloured dihydrate.

The compound is prepared in two steps from molybdenum hexacarbonyl:

The reaction of the acetate with HCl was first described as providing trimolybdenum compounds, but subsequent crystallographic analysis confirmed that the salt contains the  anion, with D4h symmetry, in which the two Mo atoms are linked by a quadruple bond. Each Mo atom is bounded with four  ligands by a single bond. Each  group is an regular square pyramid, with Mo atom at the apex, and four Cl atoms at the vertices of the square base of the pyramid. The Mo–Mo distance is 214 PM.

References

Molybdates
Chloro complexes
Potassium compounds
Chlorometallates